Kero Kero Keroppi no Daibouken is a series of video games for the Nintendo Family Computer that lasted from 1991 to 1993.

Series

Kero Kero Keroppi no Daibouken

 is based on the popular Sanrio character Keroppi. Released on the Nintendo Family Computer console in Japan in 1991.

Big Adventure is a children's puzzle game where Keroppi must rescue his girlfriend Keroleen who is locked up in a castle. To do so, he must solve the action based puzzles in seven differently themed worlds with four different types of stages (the surface of the maze, flying a plane, a Reversi-like level, and through a field of lava). All the items in the game are pre-determined; there is a need to memorize the pattern for each playthrough so that a player may advance through the levels more quickly once they have achieved a degree of expertise in the game.

Kero Kero Keroppi no Daibouken 2: Donuts Ike ha Oosawagi

 is a Japan-exclusive action video game video game for children that was released on the Family Computer console in 1993.

This video game has Sanrio's character searching for lost children who have been kidnapped by monsters. Essentially a standard Super Mario Bros. clone, the player controlling the cartoon frog has to leap around platforms jumping on baddies or killing them with his croak weapon. Each bonus level involves matching characters from the Sanrio franchise in a format similar to the card game Concentration. Intermission screens show the progress of the character throughout the game.

Levels range from the forest to a seaside setting.

Kero Kero Keroppi no Bouken Nikki

 is a Japan-exclusive role-playing game released for Super Famicom in 1994. The subtitle  is a reference to Sleeping Beauty, and the plot revolves around rescuing Keroleen after she is kidnapped in the woods during a picnic.

References
 Kero Kero Keroppi no Daibouken at GameFAQs
 Kero Kero Keroppi no Daibouken at SuperFamicom.org
 Kero Kero Keroppi no Daibouken at SFC no Game Seiha Shimasho 
 Kero Kero Keroppi no Daibouken at ocn.ne.jp
 Kero Kero Keroppi no Daibouken 2: Donuts Ike ha Oosawagi! at GameFAQs
 Kero Kero Keroppi no Daibouken 2 at SuperFamicom.org
 Credit information for Kero Kero Keroppi no Daibouken 2 at GeoCities.jp 
 Kero Kero Keroppi no Bouken Nikki at MobyGames

1991 video games
1993 video games
Character Soft games
Japan-exclusive video games
Nintendo Entertainment System games
Nintendo Entertainment System-only games
Sanrio video games
Sega franchises
Video game franchises
Video game franchises introduced in 1991
Video games based on anime and manga
Video games developed in Japan